Villanelle, FP 74, by Francis Poulenc is a piece of chamber music composed in 1934. It was  written for recorder and piano. The execution time is about 2 minutes.

Genesis 
The work was commissioned by the Australian Louise Hanson-Dyer, who inserted it into a collection of pieces for piano and recorder (entitled Pipeau).

Reception and legacy 
Because of its modesty, this piece is rarely performed. The instrument for which it is written, the recorder, deprives it of a real notoriety. It is not mentioned in the catalog of works of the composer established by the biographer Henri Hell.

Sources 
 .

 .

References

External links 
 Villanelle. FP 74 on Bibliothèque nationale de France
 Villanelle pour pipeau et piano FP 74 on IMSLP
 FP 74, Villanelle in "The Music of Francis Poulenc (1899-1963): A Catalogue
 Poulenc: Villanelle for piccolo (pipe) and piano in Presto Classico
 Villanelle pour piccolo et piano on Hyperion
 Francis Poulenc - Villanelle for Piccolo and Piano on YouTube

Compositions by Francis Poulenc
Chamber music
1934 compositions